Gift Moyo (born 20 August 1990) is a Botswanan football striker who currently plays for Jwaneng Galaxy.

References

1990 births
Living people
Botswana footballers
Botswana international footballers
Nico United players
Orapa United F.C. players
Jwaneng Galaxy F.C. players
Association football forwards